Rio: Rainbow Gate! is a Japanese anime television series animated by Xebec. Based on Tecmo's  of pachinko games (from Rakushou! Pachi-Slot Sengen), the series revolves around titular character Rio Rollins, a popular casino dealer working at the Howard Resort who is known as the "Goddess of Victory", and the thirteen cards called Gates which are used to determine the world's most skilled dealer. The anime aired on Tokyo MX and related channels between January and March 2011.

Plot
Mint Clark, a young child, comes to the Howard Resort with her grandfather and encounters Rio, and the two become the best of friends.

Rio's life soon changes when it is revealed that she is a "Gate Holder", a dealer who holds one of the 13 legendary cards called "Gates", and  whoever collects them all will be named "Most Valuable Casino Dealer" (MVCD). To collect all 13 Gates, Rio must take part in special matches called "Gate Battles" with other Gate Holders and gain their Gates to become the most valuable casino dealer in the world.

Characters

Main characters

The most popular dealer in the Howard Resort casino who abides by the motto, . Rio is the daughter of the legendary dealer Risa Rollins, and has inherited her dealing skills. She has a pet ferret named Chip, and is revealed to be afraid of lightning, as shown during her stay at Misery's castle. It is revealed during one of her Gate Battles that she is a "Roll Ruler", an individual who can change the outcome of a Gate Battle through the aid of illusions. Rio was given the #7 Gate by a mysterious man, and currently holds six Gates after her Gate Battle with King, though it was later revealed that most of the Gates she won were Rina's. She later gains the #8 Gate from Dana, the #2 Gate from Joker, and the #10 Gate from Yang-Yang following her loss to Rina at the Sky Resort. She finally beats Rina in the final battle, claiming all 13 Gates and gaining access to the Ultimate Roll Ruler and the title of MVCD, which is the title bestowed upon the greatest dealer.
Outside of the anime and pachinko games, she also stars in the Rakushou! Pachi-Slot Sengen series of games, and is a playable character in Dead or Alive Paradise and Warriors All-Stars.

A young girl who comes to the Howard Resort with her grandfather. She always carries around with her a stuffed bear named Choco.

Rio's childhood friend who had been recruited by Tom Howard as a dealer. Her mother was hospitalized and her father was frequently away on business trips when she was a child, and therefore was raised by Risa, during which she had a sibling-like relationship with Risa's daughter, Rio. She has a mysterious energy that makes her customers weary, as opposed to Rio's aura which gives her customers energy. It is later revealed that she is Rio's half-sister and a Gate Holder working under Cartia, who is revealed to be her aunt. She seeks revenge on Rio and her mother, Risa Rollins, who allegedly eloped with her father, causing Rina's mother, Ilina, to fall into a coma. She is also revealed to be a Roll Ruler, with her abilities far surpassing Rio's, but lost to Rio at the end of the series. Before the final battle, she held nine Gates, four of which were given to Linda, Jack, Queen, and King, and one of the Gates being the Ace Gate.

Howard Resort staff members

The owner of Howard Resort, donning a yellow suit with a large red bowtie and is often seen smoking a cigar. He tends to show a rather perverted nature, usually concerning the exposure of Rio's body by having her dress in embarrassing outfits. He later loses the Howard Resort following Rio's loss at a Gate Battle with Rina, but wins it back following Rio's victory and her gaining the MVCD title.

A Hollywood actress who works as a dealer at Howard Resort. Despite her movie status, she admits her popularity pales in comparison to Rio's. She was possessed by Misery's ghost in episode 3, and was later freed from her control after the latter's loss. However, it is later revealed that Misery's spirit still resides in her body, as shown in episode 9 when she takes control of Rosa's body to warn Rio of her castle being on the verge of being demolished by Cartia and in episode 12 during a ping-pong match with the other girls in a hot spring.
 and 

Twin sisters who work at the resort, both donning bunny suits. Elle usually provides explanation to Rio's abilities while Ille usually stays quiet, often just repeating the last word that was said.

A bunny girl working at the Howard Resort.

A new recruit from Russia who is training to become a dealer. Although her dealer skills are quite good, she is rather clumsy and sometimes causes havoc in the casino.

The magician of the Howard Resort and a fortune teller, using tarot cards to predict her customers' futures. It is later revealed in episode 10 that she is a Gate Holder, holding the #8 Gate.
Dana is based on the male protagonist of the same name from Tecmo's arcade title, Solomon's Key.

A cheerful robot who is the head dealer of the newly built Sky Resort, sporting noticeable tan lines. She serves as the resort's main computer terminal, controlling everything that happens with just a snap of her finger, and can link herself up with the resort's computer as well while wearing a special outfit. She was briefly reprogrammed by Jack to challenge Rio to a Gate Battle, carrying the #4 Gate hidden in her left wrist (which was given to her by Cartia, later revealed to be one of Rina's Gates), but lost after her head came loose just before crossing the finish line. A running gag in the series is that her head often falls off her body when least expected, often causing glitches in the computer system.

Antagonists

An ambitious casino dealer from Germany who seeks to take the Howard Resort in a Gate Battle, and uses her subordinates to carry out her plan. She is described as a cunning and manipulative woman who will use any means to ensure victory, and is often notoriously described by others as "an old lady". Cartia is revealed to be Rina's aunt, and has aided the latter in her plot for revenge against Rio. It has been hinted from Jack that Cartia wants to collect all of the Gates, stating that she will "see a rainbow" once she fulfills her goal, and it is later revealed from Dana that she is working with the Casino Guild to strengthen her goals.

An American cowboy who is the self-proclaimed . He held Anya hostage and challenged Rio to a game, only to lose when he later challenges to a drinking contest with a hot drink. He is later revealed to be one of Cartia's henchmen when he was given back his pistol by the latter, and later returns at the Sky Resort to carry out Cartia's plan.

She challenged Rio to a Gate Battle involving shooting targets inside a wind tunnel following the latter's previous battle with Jack. She initially had the upper hand due to her sniper abilities, and attempted to cheat by knocking Rio out, but lost following an incident involving Linda's head being knocked off by Anya which caused the wind tunnel to shut down momentarily, allowing Rio to claim victory once it was turned back on.

He is a professional con artist who often wins guessing games by crushing objects in his hand so they won't be picked. Despite his strength, he is not very bright.
 and 

Twin sisters of Chinese descent wearing jiangshi outfits. Yang-Yang is a Gate Holder known as "Number Ten" for the #10 Gate she holds, while An-An, the younger sister, is silent and taciturn, only communicating with the talisman worn on her hat. They challenged Rio and Mint to a Gate Battle involving an explosive game of concentration inside the Concentration Bomber, nearly ending in a tie until Rio uses her aura to aid Mint in winning the game. Howard reveals to Cartia that the Concentration Bomber was an unstable project, which is why he had it shut down. An-An manages to save Mint when the card underneath her exploded, where it is revealed that she is actually Choco brought to life by Yang-Yang's magic, as she wanted a companion (she claims her magic only works on items made in China). Choco turns into An-An once again during a bonus episode, where she repays Mint's kindness by buying her a camera.

The leader of the Casino Guild's radical faction.

Other characters

Mint's grandfather and a wealthy millionaire.

A gambler known as the  who came after Mint's bear. He challenges Rio to a closed poker match for it and makes a gamble to get all four Queens, but lost to Rio who wins with a pair of twos. It was later revealed that he collects stuffed animals to fulfill his sorrow from being dumped at the altar, and claims that Mint's bear is a rare Belgian collectible, only to find out from Elle and Ille that it isn't a Belgian original. He, along with Elvis, reappear later on to challenge Rio to a rematch game, only to lose to her again with Jack's aid.

A narcissistic Gate Holder holding the #3 Gate with a playboy persona, being portrayed with a multitude of swooning girls around him. Elvis is a highly skilled mathematician, being able to predict his own moves before executing them, and believes that the numbers revolve around him and are always on his side. He challenges Rio to a Gate Battle in the form of a giant roulette table and initially had the upper hand with his mathematics skills, but loses when the bandage on his finger comes off while throwing the ball. He later appears in the newly remodeled Goltschmidt Kingdom resort along with Orlin to challenge Rio to a rematch, only to lose again with aid from Jack.

A woman who once owned a castle with a casino inside of it. However, she lost everything after losing to a high-stakes game of craps. Her ghost was resurrected when lightning struck her castle, and sought to win the Howard Resort in a game. Her powers are the complete opposite to Rio's, as she brings bad luck to gamblers. She also has a bottomless appetite for chicken wings, as they were once her favorite, shown when she downs multiple boxes of them. She attacked Elle and Ille, both of whom she later possessed, and took over Rosa's body after she possessed her. She then challenged Rio to a game over the resort, and initially had the upper hand tricking Rio with her illusions, but they were dispelled after she ate a super-spicy chicken wing from Rina who disguised herself as a delivery girl, allowing Rio to win the game and her friends. It is later revealed throughout the series that Misery is still residing in Rosa's body, as she possessed the latter to tell Rio that Jack had aided her in her games against Orlin and Elvis and warned her about Cartia's intent to tear down her castle before she releases control.
 / 

Risa taught Rio and Rina her dealing techniques during their childhoods, and was the previous MVCD, having collected all 13 Gates. She disappeared from public eyes and disguised herself as Joker, a masked Gate Holder holding the #2 Gate, to hide herself from the Casino Guild and to protect Rio, and later challenges Rio to a Gate Battle to see if she is worthy of challenging Rina again. It is revealed by Rina that she allegedly had an affair with her father, which resulted in Rina's mother falling into a coma. Like Rio and Rina, she, too, has Roll Ruler abilities, and has the most powerful Roll Ruler in the series, being able to create an illusion of the Howard Resort (both inside and out) when Dana and Rio were trapped in it.

A young boy with telekinetic powers (referred to as ) and a Gate Holder, holding the Jack Gate. He and his parents were part of a bomb disposal squad, and was taken in by Cartia who just wanted to use him for his powers. He was first ordered by Cartia to reprogram Linda to challenge Rio to a Gate Battle, but relinquishes control of her after Rio won. He later appears in person to challenge Rio to a Gate Battle involving a game of Space Pinball, being offered a chance at freedom if he wins, and initially had the upper hand with his abilities, but is overwhelmed when holographic sharks appeared. He soon lost to Rio after the third stage of the match, but later teams up with her to save Mint from the fourth stage after Linda's head was accidentally knocked off by Carlos. It is hinted that Mint may have feelings for Jack when she persuades him to not use his powers against Rio prior to the match. Jack may also have feelings for Mint as well since it was hinted he was expecting a kiss from her, only to find out after it was from her stuffed bear.
Jack's name and his family's backstory of being part of a bomb disposal squad are references to the Tecmo game Mighty Bomb Jack, evidenced by the medallion he wears bearing a design resembling the game's titular protagonist's head.

An Afro samurai who has the worst streak of bad luck at the resort.

Rina's mother and Cartia's sister. She is a weak and frail person who fell into a life-threatening coma after learning that her husband is having an affair with Risa.

Rio and Rina's father, who is an executive officer of the Casino Guild.

Terminology

The cards are arranged after a suit of cards (from ace to king), and people who own these cards are called . When the 13 Gates are combined and won by the winning Gate Holder, known as the MVCD (Most Valued Casino Dealer), it forms a Rainbow Gate which can grant the MVCD one wish.

A duel in which two Gate Holders wager their Gates. Gate Battles can be any game the dealer chooses, and the Gate Holder can add any rule or condition as he/she pleases. According to Tom Howard, Gate Holders cannot refuse a Gate Battle once it has been announced. He has also stated that continuous Gate Battles can easily wear out an individual, as with the case with Rio.

A Gate Holder who can change the battlefield of a Gate Battle to his or her liking. The Roll Ruler's power depends on how many Gates a Gate Holder wields, and a Roll Ruler can also change the outcome of a Gate Battle. In rare cases, a Roll Ruler's battlefield can also reflect its user's true feelings, as with the case with Rina. There are three Roll Rulers in the series: Rio, Rina, and Risa/Joker.

Release
The series, produced by Xebec, is directed by Takao Kato, written by Mayori Sekijima, produced by Shinji Horikiri, character design by Hisashi Shimura, and music by Atsushi Umebori. The anime aired on Tokyo MX between January 4, 2011 and March 29, 2011, with subsequent broadcasts on TV Aichi, Mainichi Broadcasting System, Inc., Nico Nico Channel, BS NTV, and AT-X. Crunchyroll provides simulcasts of the series on their website to their paid subscribers, with others seeing it a week later. The series was released on seven DVD and Blu-ray volumes between April 29, 2011 and October 19, 2011, the last of which contains a bonus episode. CD singles of the songs were released on January 26, 2011 by Universal Music.

The anime was licensed in North America by Media Blasters in 2013 and released on DVD, in the Japanese language with English subtitles, on March 25, 2014. The Media Blasters version began streaming on Ani.me in 2017. The series premiered on Toku in the United States as the first program to air on the network at the time of its launch on December 31, 2015.

Episode list

See also
Gambling in Japan

References

External links
Official site 
Official blog 

2011 Japanese television series debuts
2011 Japanese television series endings
Anime television series based on video games
Anime Works
Comedy anime and manga
Anime and manga about gambling
Works based on Tecmo Koei video games
Xebec (studio)